Armon Merrell Hatcher (born July 15, 1976) is a former American football defensive back who played one season for the San Diego Chargers of the National Football League (NFL). He played college football at Oregon State.

Early life and education
Armon Hatcher was born on July 15, 1976, in Diamond Bar, California. He went to high school there before playing college football at Oregon State University. He spent five years there, redshirting his first year and lettering as a safety the next four seasons. He played in all 44 games over four seasons, making 222 tackles and 13 interceptions, including one returned for a touchdown. His 13 interceptions ranked 2nd in Oregon State history. In addition to playing defense, he was the team's kick returner, leading the PAC-10 conference for returns in 1996. He received a bachelor's degree in business administration in 1999.

Professional career

Hatcher was selected by the Buffalo Bills as the 194th pick in the 6th round of the 1999 NFL Draft. Even though he played strong safety in all four of his college seasons, he was converted to free safety upon joining the Bills. He was released at roster cuts.

He was signed by the BC Lions of the Canadian Football League (CFL) on June 16, 2000. He was released a week later.

Later in the year he was signed by the San Diego Chargers. He spent most of the season on the practice squad, but did play in four games. In the first game, a 17–16 win over the Kansas City Chiefs, Hatcher recorded one statistic, a five-yard penalty. The game would be his only NFL win, as his next three games (and every other Chargers game in the season) were each losses. He was given the most playing time in a week 17 loss against the Pittsburgh Steelers, were he recorded 3 tackles.

Hatcher was sent to NFL Europe the following year, playing in ten games for the Amsterdam Admirals. He made 34 tackles with the Admirals.

He was released by the Chargers at roster cuts in 2001.

His final team was the Frankfurt Galaxy in 2002. He appeared in ten games for the NFL Europe team, making 24 tackles. He also scored his only career touchdown with them, on a 100-yard return against the Barcelona Dragons.

Personal life
His cousin, Billy Hatcher, spent 11 seasons in Major League Baseball (MLB).

After Hatcher's sports career he operated a marketing company from 2002 to 2009. He became a coach at Ohio Northern University in August 2009. He was given the assistant defensive backs coach position as well as the freshmen team defensive coordinator role.

References

1976 births
Living people
Oregon State Beavers football players
American football safeties
People from Diamond Bar, California
Players of American football from California
Buffalo Bills players
San Diego Chargers players
Sportspeople from Los Angeles County, California
Frankfurt Galaxy players
Amsterdam Admirals players